Huckleby is a surname. Notable people with the surname include:

 Ernestine Huckleby, American victim of accidental mercury poisoning
 Harlan Huckleby (born 1957), American football player